Peter of Yugoslavia may refer to:
Peter I of Serbia (1844–1921), last King of Serbia (1903–1918) and first King of the Serbs, Croats and Slovenes (1918–1921)
Peter II of Yugoslavia (1923–1970), last King of Yugoslavia
Peter, Hereditary Prince of Yugoslavia (born 1980), American, the eldest son of Alexander, Crown Prince of Yugoslavia and Princess Maria da Gloria of Orléans Bragança, grandson of King Peter II